Aradhana is a 1987 Indian Telugu-language romantic musical film directed by Bharathiraja. It stars Chiranjeevi, Suhasini, Rajasekhar and Raadhika. The music was scored by Ilaiyaraaja. Allu Aravind produced this film on his home production, Geetha Arts. It was a remake of Bharathiraja's Tamil film Kadalora Kavithaigal. The film was released on 27 March 1987, and was a box office failure.

Plot 
Puliraju is a small-time rowdy in a small town. He meets Jennifer, who arrives in that town as a school teacher. Suhasini slaps and berates him for ill-treating his mother. Puliraju, instead of taking revenge on her, gets attracted towards her and manages to join as her student. Over a period of time, Puliraju transforms in his looks behaviour and leaves his past life behind. Over a few reels, they both get attracted towards each other, but neither of them express their feelings. His mother, surprised by changes in his behaviour, brings his maradalu Gangamma from his village and tries to marry him off. At the same time, Jennifer's family friend Rajasekhar arrives and her father plans her marriage with him. Puliraju, struggling with change within himself is attacked by his old enemies and is hospitalized. Jennifer reaches the hospital, understands his love towards her and they both unite in the climax.

Cast 
Chiranjeevi as Puliraju
Suhasini as Jennifer
Raadhika as Gangamma
Rajasekhar as Lawrence
Anuradha Vasudev as Josephine
P. L. Narayana
Bheemeswara Rao
C. H. Krishna Murthy
Prasad
Babu Rao
Dubbing Janaki as Puliraju's mother
Lalitha Sharma

Soundtrack 
The soundtrack was composed by Ilaiyaraaja and all lyrics were written by Acharya Aatreya.

References

External links 

1980s romantic musical films
1980s Telugu-language films
1987 films
Films directed by Bharathiraja
Films scored by Ilaiyaraaja
Geetha Arts films
Indian romantic musical films
Telugu remakes of Tamil films